Paleollanosaurus is an extinct genus of sphenodontid reptile that lived during the Late Triassic (Norian of Texas, United States of America).

References 

Reptiles described in 2004
Late Triassic animals of Europe
Sphenodontia
Prehistoric reptile genera